10 Years in the Life is a compilation album by electronica artist Brian Transeau, also known as BT. It was released in 2002. Disc 1 is a collection of rare songs, remixes and edits of Transeau's songs, showcasing Transeau's progression as an artist over the span of a decade. It notably includes his very first track ever recorded, "The Moment of Truth". Disc 2 is a mix album and features remixes and rare tracks done by BT, including remixes of Madonna, DJ Rap, The Crystal Method and Deep Dish. Most of the rare tracks by BT are under the names of his many aliases. The booklet that comes with the CD features stories by BT about the making of each track on both discs, as well as a series of comments about his early career, remixing, scoring films and producing music in general.

Track listing

References

2002 compilation albums
BT (musician) compilation albums